Jacksonville is an unincorporated community in Lynn Township in Lehigh County, Pennsylvania. After land had been given for a church and churchyard, the first house was built in 1820. The village was named after President Andrew Jackson in 1845. It is part of the Lehigh Valley, which has a population of 861,899 and was the 68th most populous metropolitan area in the U.S. as of the 2020 census.

Points of interest

 Jacob's Church, the third building for the congregation, was built here in 1864.
 Leaser Lake, including the 1928 monument to Frederick Leaser, who transported the Liberty Bell to the Zion Reformed Church in Allentown during the American Revolutionary War.

References

Unincorporated communities in Lehigh County, Pennsylvania
Unincorporated communities in Pennsylvania